The 2022 NBA Finals was the championship series of the National Basketball Association (NBA)'s 2021–22 season and conclusion of the season's playoffs. In this best-of-seven playoff series, the Western Conference champion Golden State Warriors defeated the Eastern Conference champion Boston Celtics in six games, winning their fourth championship in eight years. Golden State's Stephen Curry was named the Finals Most Valuable Player (MVP) for the first time in his career.

The 3-seeded Warriors (53–29) had home-court advantage in the series based on having the better regular-season record than the 2-seeded Celtics (51–31). This is the 11th time that a lower-seeded team had home-court advantage, the last time being 2019. It is also the second straight finals without a no. 1 seed from either conference, as well as the 15th time overall. The Celtics won the opening game on the road and returned to Boston with the series tied 1–1. They won their first home game to take a 2–1 lead, but the Warriors won the next three games to take the series 4–2. Golden State won their first title since 2018 and their seventh championship overall, while Boston remained tied with the Los Angeles Lakers for the most titles in league history with 17.

The NBA Finals returned to its normal June schedule for the first time since 2019, before the COVID-19 pandemic began. The series started on June 2 and concluded on June 16. Sponsored by the streaming service YouTube TV, the series was officially known as the 2022 NBA Finals presented by YouTube TV. This edition of the Finals was a rematch of the 1964 NBA Finals, in which the Celtics defeated the then-San Francisco Warriors in five games.

Background

Boston Celtics

During the 2021 offseason, the Celtics named head coach Brad Stevens president of basketball operations, replacing Danny Ainge after he announced his retirement. Stevens made his first transaction in his new position trading away Kemba Walker, a 2021 first-round pick, and a 2025 second-round pick in exchange for Al Horford, Moses Brown, and a 2023 second-round pick. Needing a replacement for Stevens, Brooklyn Nets assistant coach Ime Udoka was hired as the new head coach. After starting the season 16–19 and in 10th place in the Eastern Conference standings, the Celtics finished the regular season with a record of 51–31, winning 35 of their final 47 games to finish with the second-best record in the conference.

In the first round of the playoffs, the Celtics won in a four-game sweep over the seventh-seeded Brooklyn Nets, with numerous experts expecting a more competitive series as the Nets, with Kevin Durant, Kyrie Irving and initially James Harden before he was traded to the Philadelphia 76ers, were seen as the preseason favorites. The Celtics then faced the 2021 Finals MVP Giannis Antetokounmpo and defending champion Milwaukee Bucks, going down 3–2 in the series before eventually winning the series in seven games. After going down 2–1 in the conference finals against the first-seeded Miami Heat led by Jimmy Butler, the Celtics won in seven games, reaching the Finals for the first time since 2010 and for the 22nd time in their history.

Golden State Warriors

After reaching the Finals for five consecutive seasons (2015–2019), the Warriors were struck with injuries for the next two seasons, with Klay Thompson sitting out for the entire 2019–20 and 2020–21 campaigns, and Stephen Curry playing a combined 68 games during that time span. In 2021–22, Golden State began the season winning 18 of their first 20 games. Curry became the NBA career leader in 3-pointers, and Thompson returned on January 9, 2022, his first NBA game in 941 days. Andrew Wiggins, acquired by the Warriors in 2020 after six seasons with Minnesota, was named a starter for the 2022 NBA All-Star Game. The Warriors finished as the No. 3 seed in the Western Conference with a record of 53–29,

In the first round of the playoffs, the Warriors got past the sixth-seeded Denver Nuggets and 2022 league MVP Nikola Jokić in five games, with Curry coming off the bench in four of the five games after he returned from a foot injury. The Warriors then eliminated the second-seeded Memphis Grizzlies and the 2022 NBA Most Improved Player, Ja Morant, beating them in six games. After defeating the Dallas Mavericks in five games in the conference finals, the Warriors advanced to the Finals for the first time in three seasons, the sixth time in eight seasons, and the twelfth time in franchise history.

Road to the Finals

Notes
 z – Clinched home court advantage for the entire playoffs
 c – Clinched home court advantage for the conference playoffs
 y – Clinched division title
 x – Clinched playoff spot
 pi – Clinched play-in tournament spot
 * – Division leader

Regular season series
The Warriors and Celtics tied the regular season series 1–1, with the away team winning each game.

Series summary

Game summaries
Note: Times are EDT (UTC−4) as listed by NBA. If the venue is located in a different time zone, the local time is also given.

Game 1
 

After playing 141 playoff games without an NBA Finals appearance, Al Horford helped lead the way for Boston with 26 points, including going on an 8–0 run by himself to give his team the lead in the fourth quarter as the Celtics outscored the Warriors 40–16. Jaylen Brown also helped spark a 17–0 run in the fourth, scoring 10 of his 24 points in the final quarter. Jayson Tatum had a poor shooting performance, going 3-for-17 from the field and scoring 12 points, but he finished with a career-high 13 assists, the most ever for a player in his Finals debut. Boston's other four starters shot 30-for-50 (60%) in the game, along with shooting 12-for-23 (52%) from beyond the arc, as the Celtics hit their first seven three-point attempts in the fourth. Marcus Smart added 18 points, and Derrick White came off the bench to score 21 points.

For the Warriors, Stephen Curry got off to a hot start, scoring 21 points and shooting 6-for-8 from beyond the arc in the first quarter, the most three-pointers made in a single quarter in Finals history. In addition, the 21 points were the most in a single quarter since Michael Jordan's 22 in the fourth quarter of Game 4 in 1993. However, Curry struggled for the rest of the game, shooting 5-of-16 in the final three quarters as the Warriors blew a 92–80 lead heading into the fourth quarter. Despite collecting 11 rebounds, Draymond Green shot just 2-for-12 from the field and 0-for-3 on free throws, fouling out with a minute to go in the fourth.

The Celtics' comeback was the biggest in the Finals after three quarters since the Chicago Bulls overcame a 15-point deficit to beat the Portland Trail Blazers in Game 6 in 1992. The win also brought the Celtics record to 8–2 on the road this postseason, while the Warriors dropped to 9–1 at home. Both teams also made a combined 40 three-pointers, the most ever in an NBA Finals game, surpassing the previous record of 35 set in 2017.

Game 2

Curry scored 29 points and Golden State outscored Boston 35–14 in the third quarter to tie the series with a 107–88 win. The Warriors outscored the Celtics 43–14 from late in the second quarter to early in the fourth, transforming a tie game into a blowout. Boston committed 19 turnovers, which the Warriors converted into 33 points.

Green had nine points, five rebounds, and seven assists for Golden State, but impacted the game with his aggressiveness on defense and physical play. He forced a jump ball on Horford 13 seconds into the game, and he was the primary defender on Brown, holding him to 5-of-17 shooting. Tatum recovered from his poor shooting in Game 1, scoring 21 points in the first half of Game 2 on 7-of-16 shooting. Brown added 15 points in the first half, but Boston still trailed by two at halftime. In the third quarter, Tatum shot just twice in the third period, even though he played all 12 minutes. Horford scored just two points on four shots in the game after scoring 26 in the opener. The Celtics made just 37.5% of their shots in the game, scoring their fewest points since December 29, when they were 16–19.

The Warriors' Andre Iguodala missed the game due to inflammation in his right knee. Teammate Gary Payton II, who played for the first time since fracturing his elbow one month ago in their series against Memphis, scored seven points in 25 minutes.

Game 3

Brown scored 27 points and Tatum had 26 in a 116–100 Boston win for a 2–1 series lead. The Celtics led by as many as 18 points in the first half, but Golden State again surged in the third quarter, outscoring Boston 33–25 behind 15 points from Curry. The Warriors briefly took the lead at 83–82, but the Celtics were back up at 93–89 at the end of the period. Boston outscored Golden State 23–11 in the fourth quarter. The Celtics were the more physical team, outscoring the Warriors 52–26 in the paint and outrebounding them 47–31. Boston's Robert Williams III had 10 rebounds and four of the team's seven blocks.

Curry finished with 31 points and six 3-pointers, and Thompson added 25 points and five 3s made. Green was held to two points, four rebounds, and three assists before fouling out for the second time in the series. He became the first player in Finals history to foul out after playing at least 34 minutes with less than five points, five rebounds and five assists. Curry was injured late in the fourth when Horford fell on his leg while chasing a loose ball. Green received his sixth foul, which ejected him from the game when he pushed a Celtic from the pile; Green said Curry was howling in pain at the bottom of the pileup. The following day, Curry was confident that he would play in Game 4, saying that it was "just a pain tolerance thing that you've got to deal with." He said it was not as bad as the injury that kept him out for the final 12 games of the regular season when Boston's Smart rolled over his foot when they went for a loose ball.

Game 4

Curry scored 43 points and had 10 rebounds in a 107–97 win to even the series 2–2. He made two baskets during a 10–0 run for the Warriors in the fourth quarter, turning a four-point Boston advantage into a 100–94 lead for Golden State. He played 41 minutes and made 14 of 26 shots in the game, including 7 of 14 on 3-pointers. Andrew Wiggins added 17 points and a career-high 16 rebounds for the Warriors, who outrebounded Boston in the game, 47–31, including 15–6 on the offensive end. 

Golden State changed their starting lineup, replacing Kevon Looney with Otto Porter Jr. Curry and the Celtics' Tatum each scored 12 points in the first quarter, which ended with a 28–27 lead for Boston. Brown scored 10 points in the second quarter, giving the Celtics a 54–49 lead at halftime. There had been six lead changes in the game at that point, along with five ties. Curry scored 14 in the third for 33 going into the fourth. The teams were tied at 86 with eight minutes remaining. Boston led 94–90 with about five minutes left, but scored just once more, with 1:18 left. Golden State outscored them 17–3 to end the game, with Curry alone outscoring them 10–3. 

Curry became the third Warriors player with at least 40 points and 10 rebounds in a Finals game, joining Rick Barry (1967), and Kevin Durant (2018). He also joined Jordan and LeBron James as the only players age 34 or older to score 40 or more points in an NBA Finals contest. Green scored two points on 1-of-7 shooting, but added nine rebounds, eight assists and four steals. Golden State head coach Steve Kerr benched him for parts of the fourth quarter, while Looney remained on the floor for his rebounding—11 in 28 minutes, along with a plus–minus of +21. The Warriors were down four points with around seven minutes remaining when Green was pulled, and they went on an 11–3 run over the next four minutes before he returned.  With his offensive struggles, he alternated offensive and defensive possessions with Poole. Tatum finished with 23 points and 11 rebounds, but he made only one basket while playing the entire fourth quarter. Brown scored 21 points, and Williams had 12 rebounds for the Celtics.

Game 5

Wiggins had 26 points and 13 rebounds to lead Golden State to a 104–94 victory, placing them within a game of a championship. Thompson added 21 points to help the Warriors overcome an off night for Curry, who had 16 points and eight assists but went 0 for 9 from 3-point range. Boston was more aggressive in double-teaming Curry beyond the 3-point line. Prior to Game 5, he had NBA-record streaks of 38 consecutive games with multiple 3-pointers, 132 straight playoff games with a least one 3-point basket, and 233 consecutive games with a 3-pointer in the regular season and postseason combined. Tatum had a game-high 27 points and 10 rebounds for the Celtics, who lost consecutive games for the first time in these playoffs.

The Warriors led by as many as 16 points in the first quarter. Boston whittled away at the lead with Curry on the bench, but he made a layup to give Golden State a 51–39 advantage at halftime. Wiggins had 16 points and seven rebounds at the break, and Green was forceful with 8 points after totaling just 17 in the first four games. The Warriors were moving the ball well but shot just 3 for 17 on 3-pointers in the first half. Tatum had 13 points and eight rebounds to keep Boston in the game. After the break, the Celtics scored the first 10 points of the second half and took the lead after a 19–4 run. They made eight consecutive 3s after missing their first 12 of the game, while Golden State missed their first eight in the second half. Poole banked in a  three-pointer to beat the third-quarter buzzer, giving the Warriors a 75–74 lead to enter the fourth.

Thompson shot 7 for 14 and made five 3-pointers. The Warriors were 9 of 40 on their 3s, including 0 of 6 from Wiggins. Green, who fouled out with 3:01 left, exited with eight points, eight rebounds, and seven assists. Golden State got 15 points off the bench from Payton and 14 from Poole. Boston shot 11 of 32 from behind the arc, with Brown going 0 for 5 and shooting 5 of 18 overall; he finished with 18 points. Williams had 10 points and eight rebounds.

Game 6

Coming into the game, Golden State was 0–3 in closeout games on the road, and the Celtics were 3–0 when facing elimination. Boston took a 14–2 lead to start the game, but they made just one basket in the final 3:30 of the first quarter, and Golden State led 27–22 at the end of the period. The Warriors forced 12 turnovers in the first half and used a 21–0 run to take a 54–39 halftime lead. The 21–0 run was the longest such run in modern Finals history. They expanded their lead to 22, before the Celtics rallied to trail 76–66 after three quarters. Golden State maintained their lead through the fourth quarter to win the game 103–90 for their fourth NBA title in eight seasons. This was the second time that a road team won an NBA championship in Boston, the other being the Los Angeles Lakers in 1985.

Curry scored 34 points in the game, shooting 12-of-21 overall and 6-of-11 on 3-pointers, and added seven rebounds, seven assists, and two steals. He was voted the Finals MVP for the first time in his career, unanimously selected after averaging 31.2 points, 6.0 rebounds, and 5.0 assists in the series. He scored 30 or more points in three consecutive games in Boston, the first player to do so in the playoffs since LeBron James in 2017. Green scored 12 points on 5-of-10 shooting, grabbing 12 rebounds, recording eight assists with two steals and two blocks. He also hit two 3-pointers after missing his first 12 attempts of the series. For head coach Steve Kerr, he won his ninth championship overall, after winning five as a player. He became the sixth coach to capture four titles, joining Phil Jackson, Red Auerbach, John Kundla, Gregg Popovich and Pat Riley. The Warriors also became the first team to go from the NBA's worst record (2019–20) to a championship within a three-season span. With the win, the Warriors earned their seventh double-digit comeback win this postseason, which tied the 2011 and 2012 Miami Heat for the most double-digit comeback wins by any team in the past 25 postseasons.

Brown led the Celtics with 34 points but Tatum finished with just 13, shooting just 6-of-18 from the field. The Celtics' bench also performed poorly, receiving just five points on 2-for-10 shooting from the field from their primary reserves—White, Grant Williams, and Payton Pritchard. Boston also committed 22 turnovers, dropping to 1–8 this postseason when committing 16 or more. Tatum set the NBA record for most turnovers in a single postseason with 100. The Celtics' Finals series record dropped to 17–5, remaining tied with the Lakers for the most championships in league history.

Rosters

Player statistics

|-
! scope="row" style="text-align:left;"|
| 6 || 6 || 38.8 || .431 || .340 || .806 || 7.3 || 3.7 || 0.8 || 0.3 || 23.5
|-
! scope="row" style="text-align:left;"|
| 6 || 6 || 40.7 || .367 || .455 || .656 || 6.8 || 7.0 || 1.2 || 0.7 || 21.5
|-
! scope="row" style="text-align:left;"|
| 6 || 6 || 35.5 || .430 || .412 || .750 || 4.5 || 5.0 || 1.5 || 0.0 || 15.2
|-
! scope="row" style="text-align:left;|
| 6 || 6 || 31.8 || .605 || .625 || .667 || 8.5 || 2.8 || 0.7 || 0.7 || 12.5
|-
! scope="row" style="text-align:left;"|
| 6 || 6 || 26.3 || .769 || .000 || .833 || 7.5 || 1.5 || 0.8 || 2.8 || 7.5
|-
! scope="row" style="text-align:left;"|
| 6 || 0 || 26.5 || .327 || .400 || .929 || 1.5 || 2.2 || 0.7 || 0.5 || 9.8
|-
! scope="row" style="text-align:left;"|
| 6 || 0 || 17.0 || .529 || .300 || .667 || 2.3 || 1.0 || 0.2 || 0.7 || 4.2
|-
! scope="row" style="text-align:left;"|
| 6 || 0 || 11.2 || .300 || .214 || .500 || 2.2 || 1.0 || 0.2 || 0.0 || 2.7
|-
! scope="row" style="text-align:left;"|
| 3 || 0 || 2.0 || 1.000 || 1.000 || .000 || 0.7 || 0.3 || 0.0 || 0.0 || 1.7
|-
! scope="row" style="text-align:left;"|
| 2 || 0 || 10.0 || .500 || .500 || .000 || 2.5 || 0.5 || 0.0 || 1.0 || 1.5
|-
! scope="row" style="text-align:left;"|
| 5 || 0 || 3.2 || .333 || .000 || .750 || 0.8 || 0.4 || 0.2 || 0.0 || 1.4
|-
! scope="row" style="text-align:left;"|
| 3 || 0 || 2.0 || 1.000 || 1.000 || .000 || 0.0 || 0.0 || 0.0 || 0.0 || 1.0
|-
! scope="row" style="text-align:left;"|
| 5 || 0 || 2.2 || .333 || .500 || .000 || 0.0 || 0.4 || 0.0 || 0.0 || 0.6
|-
! scope="row" style="text-align:left;"|
| 5 || 0 || 1.8 || .250 || .250 || .000 || 0.6 || 0.2 || 0.0 || 0.0 || 0.6
|-
! scope="row" style="text-align:left;"|
| 4 || 0 || 1.3 || .000 || .000 || .000 || 0.3 || 0.0 || 0.0 || 0.0 || 0.0

|-! style="background:#FDE910;"
! scope="row" style="text-align:left; background:#FDE910"|
| 6 || 6 || 37.5 || .482 || .437 || .857 || 6.0 || 5.0 || 2.0 || 0.2 || 31.2
|-
! scope="row" style="text-align:left;"|
| 6 || 6 || 39.2 || .446 || .297 || .692 || 8.8 || 2.2 || 1.5 || 1.5 || 18.3
|-
! scope="row" style="text-align:left;"|
| 6 || 6 || 38.3 || .356 || .351 || 1.000 || 3.0 || 2.0 || 1.3 || 0.5 || 17.0
|-
! scope="row" style="text-align:left;"|
| 6 || 6 || 36.2 || .333 || .125 || .583 || 8.0 || 6.2 || 1.7 || 0.7 || 6.2
|-
! scope="row" style="text-align:left;"|
| 6 || 3 || 17.0 || .588 || .563 || 1.000 || 2.0 || 1.0 || 1.0 || 0.2 || 5.2
|-
! scope="row" style="text-align:left;"|
| 6 || 3 || 21.7 || .636 || .000 || 1.000 || 7.5 || 2.7 || 0.7 || 0.8 || 5.0
|-
! scope="row" style="text-align:left;"|
| 6 || 0 || 20.8 || .435 || .385 || .909 || 1.8 || 1.8 || 0.5 || 0.2 || 13.2
|-
! scope="row" style="text-align:left;"|
| 5 || 0 || 18.6 || .591 || .286 || .700 || 3.2 || 1.4 || 1.6 || 0.4 || 7.0
|-
! scope="row" style="text-align:left;"|
| 4 || 0 || 4.8 || .750 || 1.000 || .000 || 0.0 || 1.3 || 0.0 || 0.0 || 1.8
|-
! scope="row" style="text-align:left;"|
| 5 || 0 || 5.8 || .500 || .500 || .000 || 1.6 || 0.2 || 0.4 || 0.0 || 1.8
|-
! scope="row" style="text-align:left;"|
| 4 || 0 || 2.8 || 1.000 || .000 || .000 || 0.0 || 0.0 || 0.0 || 0.3 || 0.5
|-
! scope="row" style="text-align:left;"|
| 4 || 0 || 2.0 || .000 || .000 || .000 || 0.3 || 0.0 || 0.0 || 0.0 || 0.0
|-
! scope="row" style="text-align:left;"|
| 4 || 0 || 2.0 || .000 || .000 || .000 || 0.0 || 0.0 || 0.0 || 0.0 || 0.0
|-
! scope="row" style="text-align:left;"|
| 4 || 0 || 2.0 || .000 || .000 || .000 || 0.5 || 0.8 || 0.0 || 0.0 || 0.0

 Bold: team high
Source:

Redesigned logo and trophy
On April 13, the NBA released a reimagined version of the classic NBA Finals wordmark that was used between 1986 and 1995 and from 2004 to 2017. The new logo also features a depiction of the Larry O'Brien Championship Trophy in the background.

The NBA then announced on May 12 that the Larry O'Brien Championship Trophy and the Bill Russell NBA Finals Most Valuable Player Trophy have also been redesigned. Among the new changes to the Larry O'Brien Trophy, its base now consists of two disks that list the names of all the previous winning teams. The Bill Russell Trophy has been changed from a gold ball and silver net to primarily gold with silver accents.

With NBA commissioner Adam Silver missing games 5 and 6 due to the league’s health and safety protocols, the Larry O’Brien Trophy was presented to the Warriors by deputy commissioner Mark Tatum instead.

Media coverage
The Finals was televised in the United States by ABC for the 20th consecutive year.

Lead play-by-play announcer Mike Breen and lead analyst Jeff Van Gundy both missed Game 1 due to COVID-19 protocols. ESPN's No. 2 play-by-play announcer, Mark Jones, filled in for Breen during games 1 and 2. Jones, Mark Jackson and Lisa Salters made history in Game 1 as the first all-African American broadcast team to cover an NBA Finals game. Van Gundy returned to the broadcast booth for Game 2, followed by Breen in Game 3.

ESPN put together a Megacast option for Game 1 called NBA Finals: Celebrating 75, hosted by Michael Eaves alongside New Orleans Pelicans guard CJ McCollum and Tim Legler. It was broadcast on ESPN2 due to ESPN's commitments to have the Women's College World Series on the main network.

Viewership

References

External links
2022 NBA Finals official website
2022 NBA Finals at Basketball-Reference.com

2021–22 NBA season
National Basketball Association Finals
2022 in sports in Massachusetts
2022 in sports in California
Boston Celtics games
Golden State Warriors games
NBA Finals
Basketball competitions in Boston
Basketball competitions in San Francisco